Cordy is an iOS and Android game developed by SilverTree Media/SilverTree Holdings LP and released on July 27, 2011. Cordy is a platform game with 27 levels.

After SilverTree was acquired by GSN Games in late March 2013, the app disappeared from the App Store (iOS/iPadOS), then Google Play. It remains visible on the Amazon App Store and Microsoft Store.

Two sequels, Cordy Sky and Cordy 2, were released on March 28, 2012 and February 7, 2013 respectively.

Plot
The story is of a robot exploring their world to find out the cause behind a power outage and fix it.
Currently, the only know enemies are Boogie Bullies and some sort of boss. Any information on them are currently blank.

Gameplay

Reception
The game has a Metacritic score of 82% based on 7 critic reviews.

148Apps wrote " A fantastic platformer and a stellar iOS game. The controls are fluid, the visuals are wonderful and the levels all beg to be played over-and-over again in order to nab a full trio of stars (one each for completion, speed and gear collecting). " VidioGamer said " Cordy is simple enough for beginners yet also packs in a decent challenge for more experienced players. " Multiplayer.it wrote " Cordy is a great platformer, which recalls the style and the gameplay of LittleBigPlanet. The game features some very nice graphics, very accurate touch controls and 26 levels, asking you to complete them in several ways to get all the stars. If you like the genre, this is a must buy. " Pocket Gamer France said " If you're looking for a platform game packed with personality and hooked on great ideas, give Cordy a try. " Modojo said " Unlock the full game and have a blast. We certainly hope more (and free) levels are on the way. " 3DJuegos said " Cordy is a nice and simple platformer crafted with a great style and good graphics. " Touch Arcade said " Cordy doesn't bring a whole lot of innovation to the table, but, even with some slightly off physics, it's a game that makes a lasting visual impression first and plays well-enough second. "

Legacy

Cordy Sky
Modojo gave the game a 90/100, writing " You don't often see free games of such high quality on the App Store, and when you do, a bunch of annoying ads partially ruin the experience. There is no such problem with Cordy Sky, and we applaud SilverTree Media for reintroducing us to such a charming hero while at the same time making Doodle Jump a fond memory. " AppSpy rated the game 80%, commenting " Cordy Sky provides a surprisingly strong distraction thanks to a bouncy challenge that ramps up slowly and keeps introducing new elements to make your journey all the more whacky. " 148Apps rated the game 70/100, writing " The game isn't going to eat up hours, but there is some added replay value in the Game Center achievements. For a casual pick-up-and-play title Cordy Sky is refined and lots of good free fun. "

Cordy 2
The game has a Metacritic score of 84% based on 9 critic reviews.

TouchGen wrote " Cordy 2 plays like a dream with precise controls, excellent level design and all presented in a great style. Who wouldn´t want to stomp on the evil Boogaloo? " Apple'N'Apps said " Cordy 2 is the most deluxe platformer yet on iOS with so much to enjoy making it a must buy as Cordy has become the Mario of iOS. " 148Apps wrote " Cordy 2 offers plenty of in-app purchases but none other than the initial $4.99 outlay for the full game, are actually needed. Instead, they offer customization options that I found unnecessary to my enjoyment of the game. Offering plenty of charm and little reason to criticize, Cordy 2 is an utterly delightful platformer. " Modojo said " Cordy 2 is hands-down one of the finest platform games you can pick up for your mobile or tablet. It looks absolutely stunning, the controls work effortlessly, and those who absolutely must achieve perfection on every level will be kept exploring its incredible depths for weeks to come. Highly recommended. "

Multiplayer.it said " It's really hard to find something wrong with Cordy 2, since it's the perfect sequel to an already solid platformer. " Games Master UK described the game as " A vibrant and accomplished platformer filled with charm and variety." Gamezebo said " Simple objectives, challenging platforming, and an adorable art style make Cordy 2 a worthy addition to your library. It's got a robust set of in-app purchases for those looking to take their game further, and plenty of heart to carry it along. Put this little robot in your pocket and check out the first game while you're at it. " SlideToPlay wrote " If you’re looking for a solid platforming experience on the iPhone, Cordy is a great place to start. " Pocket Gamer UK wrote " An entertaining platformer with a decent chunk of content, Cordy 2 will keep you playing for a good while, but it doesn't bring anything new to the platform genre. "

References

2011 video games
Android (operating system) games
IOS games
Platform games
Video games developed in the United States